Josh Kear is a Nashville-based songwriter signed to Sony/ATV Music Publishing.

In 2007, he cowrote Carrie Underwood’s hit "Before He Cheats" with Chris Tompkins. The song spent five weeks at the top of the charts. His song "Drinking Class", performed by Lee Brice, was the most played country song of 2015 according to the Billboard country airplay chart. Other songwriting credits include "Most People Are Good" by Luke Bryan, which held a number one spot on Billboard's Country Airplay chart for three weeks, "Woman, Amen" by Dierks Bentley, "Buy My Own Drinks" by Runaway June, "The Way I See It" by Mason Ramsey, "More" by Clare Dunn, and "The Best Is Yet To Come" by Drake White.

"Need You Now", cowritten with and performed by Lady Antebellum, spent five weeks at number one on the country chart and 14 weeks at number one on the adult contemporary chart. The song earned two Grammy Awards, winning for both Country Song of the Year and Overall Song of the Year in 2011. Kear also won Grammy Awards for Country Song Of The Year for "Before He Cheats” and “Blown Away”. Kear remains the only country songwriter to win the Country Song Of The Year Grammy three times.

Other number one songs that Kear has written or cowritten include "God, Your Mama and Me" by Florida Georgia Line (featuring Backstreet Boys), “Highway Don't Care” by Tim McGraw (featuring Taylor Swift and Keith Urban), "Drunk on a Plane” by Dierks Bentley, "Neon Light” by Blake Shelton, both “Blown Away” and "Two Black Cadillacs” by Carrie Underwood, “Helluva Life” by Frankie Ballard, and “Drunk On You” by Luke Bryan.

Still more songs with which Kear has been involved include “(Kissed You) Good Night and “Wild At Heart” by Gloriana, “Dancin' Away with My Heart” and “Goodbye Town” by Lady Antebellum, and "Redneck Crazy” by Tyler Farr. Kear also co-wrote and produced "Just Like You Like It" off of Backstreet Boys' 2019 album DNA.

Kear has received 14 ASCAP country airplay awards, two ASCAP pop airplay awards, and three ASCAP country Song of the Year awards for “Before He Cheats”,  “Need You Now” and “Drunk On You”. In 2013 he won the ASCAP Country Songwriter of the Year award.

Kear is an advocate for songwriter's rights. He has made multiple trips to Washington D.C. to lobby congress on behalf of songwriters. He also performed for the Library of Congress in 2014 as part of ASCAP’s "We Write The Songs" series along with Randy Newman, Carly Simon and Heart. Kear also helped write the theme song for ASCAP’s 100th Anniversary, "More Than The Stars", collaborating with such writers as Ne-Yo, Dan Wilson, Stargate, Bill Withers and others.

Selected songwriting credits

Awards

External links
 Carrie Underwood Associated Press
 AIMP Panel 2012  -  Josh Kear, Mike Stoller, Desmond Child
Winners List  at cmaawards.com
 GulfCoastNews.com Feature Article
Big Yellow Dog Music website
 Playback Magazine Feature Story

References

1974 births
Middle Tennessee State University alumni
Living people
Grammy Award winners
People from Jonesborough, Tennessee